Nguyễn Chí Thiện (27 February 19392 October 2012) was a North Vietnamese dissident, activist and poet who spent a total of twenty-seven years as a political prisoner of the communist regimes of both North Vietnam and of post-1975 Vietnam, before being released and allowed to join the large Overseas Vietnamese community in the United States.

Biography 

Thien was educated in private academies and was a supporter of Viet Minh revolutionaries in his early life. In 1960, however, he challenged the official history of World War II – that the Soviet Union had defeated the Imperial Army of Japan in Manchukuo, ending the war – while teaching a high school history class. Thien told the class that the United States defeated Japan when they dropped the atomic bombs on Hiroshima and Nagasaki.

He was sentenced to two years imprisonment, and served three years and six months in re-education camps. Thien began composing poems in prison and committed them to memory. After a brief release in 1966, he was jailed again for composing politically irreverent poems. He denied the charges, and spent another eleven years and five months in labor camps.

In 1977, two years after Saigon fell, Thien and other political prisoners were released to make room for defeated officers from the South Vietnamese military. Thien used his release to write down the poems he had thus far committed solely to memory.

Two days after Bastille Day, on 16 July 1979, after having been thwarted from his initial plan to enter the French embassy because of the closely guarded compound, Thien dashed into the British embassy in Hanoi with his manuscript of four hundred poems and the cover letter drafted in French as it was meant for the original destination.

British Foreign Office diplomats welcomed him and promised to send his manuscript out of the country. When he left, the Vietnamese secret police (MPS) agents were already waiting and arrested him at the embassy gate. He was imprisoned yet again, this time in the Hỏa Lò Prison (known among American POWs as the "Hanoi Hilton") for six years, then six more years at other prisons in northern Vietnam.

During this imprisonment, Thien's poems which made their way to the West were translated into English by Huỳnh Sanh Thông of Yale University. The work won the International Poetry Award in Rotterdam in 1985. He was also adopted as a prisoner of conscience by Amnesty International in 1986. Twelve years after bringing his manuscript to the British Embassy, he was released from jail. He lived in Hanoi under close surveillance by the authorities, but his international followers also kept an eye on Thien.

Human Rights Watch honored him in 1995. That year he was also permitted to emigrate to the United States with the intervention of Noboru Masuoka, a retired U.S. Air Force colonel and career military officer who was drafted into the U.S. Army following internment in Heart Mountain camp for Japanese Americans in 1945.

He immediately wrote Hoa Dia Nguc II, poems composed in his memory (as he was not allowed pen and paper in prison) from 1979 to 1988.  They were published in bilingual editions (Vietnamese and English) then again in its Vietnamese entirety in 2006.

In 1998 Nguyen Chi Thien was awarded a fellowship from the International Parliament of Writers. He lived in France for three years, writing the Hoa Lo Stories, a prose narrative of his experiences in prison. These were translated and published in English as the Hoa Lo / Hanoi Hilton Stories by Yale Southeast Asia Studies in 2007.

Thien's original manuscript was returned to him in early 2008 by the widow of Prof. Patrick Honey of the University of London, who had shared the material with many Vietnamese exiles, but always guarded the original work.

Nguyen Chi Thien died in Santa Ana, California on 2 October 2012.

Awards and honors
1985 Rotterdam International Poetry Prize 
1989 PEN/Barbara Goldsmith Freedom to Write Award

References

Sources
Hoa Lo, Hanoi Hilton Stories by Nguyen Chi Thien.  Yale Southeast Asia Studies, 2007. 
Hai Truyen Tu, Two Prison Life Stories; Nguyen Chi Thien's prose in bilingual text.  Allies for Freedom publishers, 2008.

External links
 Nguyen Chi Thien at Viet Nam Literature Project
 Biographical sources and photos at Vietnam Review

1939 births
2012 deaths
20th-century Vietnamese poets
20th-century male writers
American poetry in immigrant languages
American Roman Catholic poets
Amnesty International prisoners of conscience held by Vietnam
Catholic poets
Deaths from pneumonia in California
People from Hanoi
Vietnamese democracy activists
Vietnamese dissidents
Vietnamese emigrants to the United States
Vietnamese male poets
Vietnamese prisoners and detainees
Vietnamese Roman Catholics